This is a list of airports in the Cayman Islands.

The Cayman Islands are a British overseas territory.



Airports 

Airport names shown in bold have scheduled passenger service on commercial airlines.

See also 

 Transport in the Cayman Islands
 List of airports by ICAO code: M#MW - Cayman Islands
 List of airports in the United Kingdom and the British Crown Dependencies
 Wikipedia: WikiProject Aviation/Airline destination lists: North America#Cayman Islands (United Kingdom)

References 
 
  - includes IATA codes
 Great Circle Mapper: Airports in the Cayman Islands
 FallingRain.com: Airports in the Cayman Islands

 
Airports
Cayman Islands